OUSA may mean:

 The Ontario Undergraduate Student Alliance
 The Open University Students Association, the students' union of the Open University
 The Organization of African Trade Union Unity (Organisation de l'Unité Syndicale Africaine)
 Orienteering USA, the national sports governing body for orienteering in the United States
 OrigamiUSA The largest Origami society in the USA
 The Otago University Students' Association